The Blue Cross Blue Shield Tower (BCBS) is on the north end of Millennium Park along E. Randolph Street at the NE corner of Randolph and Columbus Drive, in Chicago, Illinois, United States of America. It is home to the headquarters of Health Care Service Corporation.

The building's address is 300 E. Randolph Street and is next to the Aon Center. Original plans to connect the two buildings via an underground pedway never came to fruition.

Architect James Goettsch of Goettsch Partners designed the building. The 33-story first phase was completed in 1997 under the firm name of Lohan Associates (now Goettsch Partners). The 24-story second phase started in 2007 and was completed in 2010.

Expansion 
In 2006 the City of Chicago granted a building permit to Health Care Service Corporation Blue Cross Blue Shield of Illinois to renovate the building upwards, which gave additional 24 stories and made the building 57 stories in total (3 floors below ground). Upon its completion, it became the first project in Chicago that built upon an existing tower.

Tenants
Baker & McKenzie
Health Care Service Corporation
Isobar
Inverse Marketing
McKinsey & Company

Tower as billboard

The management of the Blue Cross Blue Shield Tower frequently shows its support for health care issues, local events, Chicago sports, and charities by arranging to have appropriate messaging displayed at night on the south facade of the building facing Grant Park.

Unlike the nearby CNA Center, the drafting of the message is done by hand.

Position in Chicago's skyline

See also
 List of tallest buildings in Chicago
List of tallest buildings in the United States

References

External links
 Phorio listing
 Emporis listing

Skyscraper office buildings in Chicago
Office buildings completed in 1997
Insurance company headquarters in the United States
Lakeshore East
1997 establishments in Illinois